Eurowings Discover is a German airline headquartered in Frankfurt. It is owned by the Lufthansa Group and serves leisure destinations around the Mediterranean, North America and the Caribbean from its bases at Frankfurt Airport and Munich Airport.

History
Eurowings Discover started operations on 24 July 2021, flying from Frankfurt to Mombasa and Zanzibar with A330, having obtained its air operator's certificate. It is considered to be the main competitor of German leisure carrier Condor which serves several of the routes Eurowings Discover will also take up.

The carrier has already expanded its network to Punta Cana, Windhoek and Victoria Falls. Later in 2021 Eurowings Discover was added flights to Las Vegas, Mauritius, Bridgetown, Montego Bay, Varadero, Canary Islands, Egypt, and Morocco. The fleet is supposed to grow to 10 A320s and 11 A330s by mid 2022.

In September 2021, Lufthansa announced it would move responsibility for several mid-haul leisure routes to Eurowings Discover. It based three Airbus A320-200s in Frankfurt serving five destinations on the Canary Islands in late 2021. 

In summer 2022, Eurowings Discover established its second operational base at Munich Airport, focused on short-haul operations around the Mediterranean.

In September 2022, Lufthansa moved some of its own routes to Canada to Eurowings Discover for the upcoming winter season. In late 2022, Eurowings Discover announced it would focus its long-haul operations at Frankfurt Airport, terminating their North American and Caribbean services from Munich Airport. Prior to this, the flights were already suspended as the airline took over North American routes at Frankfurt Airport from parent Lufthansa due to staff shortages.

Destinations

Fleet 

, Eurowings Discover operates the following aircraft:

References

External links

Airlines of Germany
Lufthansa Group
Airlines established in 2021